The Thaheem sometimes spelled "Thahim" or "Tahim" are a tribe found in the Western Plains of Pakistan, Punjab mainly Multan, Chiniot including parts of Sindh like Jacobabad and Sujawal where it is influential. The most prominent member of this tribe was Saadullah Khan of Chiniot, a place where they still hold land. Some allege the Thaheems to be of Arab origin, particularly from the Banu Tamim. But some others point out that they are a tribe of Jats in the Western Plains of Punjab.

See also 
Bafan

References 

Punjabi tribes
Saraiki tribes
Sindhi tribes
Jat tribes
Jat
Jat clans